Fasciolidae is a family of trematodes and includes several parasites involved in the veterinary and medical sciences, which cause the disease Fasciolosis. Fasciolidae is divided into five genera by Olson et al. 2003. The family's various species are localised in liver, gall bladder, and intestine. Their life-cycle includes an intermediate host, freshwater snails from the family Lymnaeidae.

Morphology
Adult trematodes of Fasciolidae range in length from 2 cm, for species of Parafasciolopsis, and 10 cm, for species such as Fasciola gigantica. The oral and ventral suckers are usually located. the cercariae are of a gymnocephalic shape.

Systematics within family 
According to Olson et al. 2003  the family has five genera:
Fasciola
Fasciola hepatica – Common liver fluke
Fasciola gigantica
Fasciola spp. – Japanese strain
Fascioloides
Fascioloides magna
Fascioloides jacksoni
Fasciolopsis
Fasciolopsis buski
Parafasciolopsis
Parafasciolopsis fasciolaemorpha
Protofasciola
Protofasciola robusta

References 

 
Trematode families
Veterinary helminthology